The Wangwi was a Go competition in South Korea.

Outline 
The Wangwi was a Go competition used by the Hanguk Kiwon. It is sponsored by the Chung-ang Il-po. The komi for white is 6.5 points. The preliminary matches get 4 hours of thinking time, while the final match gets 5 hours. The winner's purse was 45,000,000 SKW (US$40,000). It ran from 1966-2008.

Past winners

See also
Oza
Wangjia

References

Wangwi